Nicastro may refer to:

 Nicastro, a small town in the province of Catanzaro, in the Calabria region of southern Italy

 Francesco Nicastro (born 1991), Italian football forward
 Fredrik Wikström Nicastro, Svensk film producer and head of feature films at the production company Tre Vänner
 Michelle Nicastro (1960–2010), American actress and singer 
 Nicholas Nicastro (born 1963), American author and film critic
 Roberto Nicastro (born 1964), Italian Chairman of the "Good Banks" and Group General Manager of Unicredit

 J. McIntyre Machinery, Ltd. v. Nicastro, a 2011 decision by the US Supreme Court about the exercise of court jurisdictions